Gordon Alexander McRae (born April 12, 1948) is a Canadian retired professional hockey goaltender. He played in 71 regular season and 8 playoff games for the Toronto Maple Leafs of the National Hockey League from 1972 to 1978.

Playing career
After a three-year college career with the Michigan Tech Huskies, McRae played with Charlotte of the Eastern Hockey League and Providence in the American Hockey League before joining the Tulsa Oilers of the Central Hockey League in 1971. Signed by Toronto, he first appeared with the Leafs in 11 games during the 1972–73 season. He spent the next few years bouncing between the NHL club and its minor league affiliates in the CHL. His best season was 1974–75 when he appeared in 20 games, posting a 10–3–6 record with a 3.29 GAA. He backstopped the team to a first-round playoff upset over the Los Angeles Kings that season. McRae final seasons were either as a back-up with the Leafs or in the Central League before retiring after the 1977–78 season. While with the Dallas Black Hawks of the CHL in 1976–77, he won the Terry Sawchuk trophy and was named to the CHL first All-Star team.

Career statistics

Regular season and playoffs

External links 
 

1948 births
Living people
Anglophone Quebec people
Canadian ice hockey goaltenders
Charlotte Checkers (EHL) players
Dallas Black Hawks players
Ice hockey people from Quebec
Jacksonville Rockets players
Jersey Devils players
Michigan Tech Huskies men's ice hockey players
Oklahoma City Blazers (1965–1977) players
Ontario Hockey Association Senior A League (1890–1979) players
Providence Reds players
Sportspeople from Sherbrooke
Toronto Maple Leafs players
Tulsa Oilers (1964–1984) players
Undrafted National Hockey League players